Arachno-Bot is a printable spider robot built as an exploratory tool in environments that are too hazardous for humans. It gets its name because the robot's looks and movement are similar to a real spider. Fraunhofer Institute for Manufacturing Engineering and Automation in Stuttgart, Germany has developed Arachno-Bot by using a natural spider as the model for their robot, which was created through 3D printing.

Construction
Arachno-Bot has eight legs just like a real spider and are operated by hydraulics while elastic bellows drives serve as joints. It is created using a 3D printing process called selective laser sintering. The process allows the robots to be quickly produced at a cheap cost.

References

Robotic spiders
2011 robots
Robots of Germany